Drake's Brewing Company is a craft brewery in San Leandro, California. The company started in 1989 as a wholesale-only kegged beer seller under the name Lind Brewing, after company founder, Roger Lind.  Drake's operates out of the old Caterpillar Inc. production facility located behind a Walmart. In 2008, Drake's was sold to the owners of Triple Rock Brewery and Alehouse, a brewpub in Berkeley, California.

In 2015, Drake's opened a new taproom in an old car dealership building in Oakland, called Drake's Dealership. In 2018, Drake's opened a taproom, restaurant and events center in West Sacramento called The Barn. 

Drake's operates a taproom called Drake's Barrel House inside its barrel aging warehouse in San Leandro, California. Most of the barrel aged beers are unique to the taproom and are not usually available for growler or keg fills; Drake's first bottling of a barrel aged beer, Reunion Barley Wine Ale, occurred in 2013.

Awards

See also 
 List of breweries in California

References 

Drinking establishments in the San Francisco Bay Area
Beer brewing companies based in the San Francisco Bay Area
Companies established in 1989
Companies based in San Leandro, California
Food and drink in the San Francisco Bay Area
1989 establishments in California